The Americas Zone  was one of three Zones of Davis Cup competition in 2004.

Group I

Brazil relegated to Group II in 2005.
Chile and Paraguay advance to World Group Play-off.

Group II

Puerto Rico and Haiti relegated to Group III in 2005.
Mexico promoted to Group I in 2005.

Group III

 
  - promoted to Group II for 2005
  
 
  -  promoted to Group II for 2005
 
  -  demoted to Group IV for 2005
  -  demoted to Group IV for 2005

Group IV

 
  - promoted to Group III for 2005
  
 
  - promoted to Group III for 2005

References

External links
Davis Cup draw details

See also

 
Americas
Davis Cup Americas Zone